Mian Rahan (also Romanized as Mīān Rāhān, Meyān Rāhān, and Mīyān Rāhān) is a city and capital of Dinavar District, in Sahneh County, Kermanshah Province, Iran.  At the 2006 census, its population was 489, in 131 families and at the 1390 = 2012 census, its population was 598, in 177 families . Its people speak the Laki dialect.

References

Populated places in Sahneh County

Cities in Kermanshah Province